SR819 may refer to:
S.R. 819- season six episode nine of The X-Files
State Road 19- state roads numbered 819